Mullurkara  is a village in  Thalapilly Taluk of Thrissur district in the state of Kerala, India.   
The Malayalam film actress Philomina was born here.

Demographics
 India census, Mullurkara had a population of 11922 with 5710 males and 6212 females.
Mullurkara falls on the Palakkad - Thrisshur Highway. Shoranur Jn is the nearest bigger Rail head. Nearest Airport is Nedumbassery Airport ( Cochin), which is approximately 1.5 hours drive. Thrissur medical college (m g kavu) 16 km

References

Villages in Thrissur district